This is a list of senators from the Australian Capital Territory since the territories were first allowed to elect senators in 1975.

List

Politics of the Australian Capital Territory
Senators, Australian Capital Territory